"Extraordinary" is a song recorded by American musician Prince. It was issued as the lead single from his twenty-second studio album The Vault: Old Friends 4 Sale (1999). It was released on August 10, 1999 as a CD single, exclusively in the United States. Prince solely wrote and produced it, while a series of individuals provided various instrumentation for the track.

The single was originally recorded in September 1992 and remained unreleased for six years until the announcement of The Vault: Old Friends 4 Sale. It was the only single released from the album, besides a series of three promotional singles, "The Rest of My Life", "5 Women", and "It's About That Walk". The song was sent to mainstream radio on August 10, two weeks before the release of the album.

Track listing

Credits and personnel 
Credits adapted from The Vault: Old Friends 4 Sale liner notes

 Prince – vocals, lyrics, production, instruments
 Michael B. – drums
 Tommy Barbarella – keyboards

 Mr. Hayes – keyboards
 Levi Seacer, Jr. – guitar
 Sonny T. – bass guitar

References 

1999 singles
1999 songs
Prince (musician) songs
Song recordings produced by Prince (musician)
Songs written by Prince (musician)